BDI may refer to:

Science and technology
 Beck Depression Inventory, a psychometric test for measuring the severity of depression
 Belief–desire–intention model, a cognitive model developed by Michael Bratman
 Belief–desire–intention software model, a methodology and framework for programming rational and intelligent agents
 bdi (bi-directional isolation), an HTML element that isolates an online section of text
 Big Data Institute, at the University of Oxford

Other uses
 Baltic Dry Index, an economic indicator
 Bradford Interchange, West Yorkshire, England (National Rail station code)
 Brand development index, a measure used in the allocation of media, and promotion for a specific product or service
 Bundesverband der Deutschen Industrie, Federation of German Industries 
 Burundi (ISO 3166-1 alpha-3 country code)
 Democratic Union for Integration, the largest Albanian political party in North Macedonia
 Behavioural Dynamics Institute, a precursor to the SCL Group

See also
 Beady Eye, a 2010s British rock group